William Royce "Boz" Scaggs (born June 8, 1944) is an American singer, songwriter, and guitarist. An early bandmate of Steve Miller in The Ardells and the Steve Miller Band, he began his solo career in 1969, though he lacked a major hit until his 1976 album Silk Degrees peaked at number 2 on the Billboard 200, and produced the hit singles "Lido Shuffle" and "Lowdown". Scaggs produced two more platinum-certified albums in Down Two Then Left and Middle Man, the latter of which produced two top-40 singles "Breakdown Dead Ahead" and "Jojo". After a hiatus for most of the 1980s, he returned to recording and touring in 1988, joining The New York Rock and Soul Revue and opening the nightclub Slim's, a popular San Francisco music venue until it closed in 2020. He has continued to record and tour throughout the 1990s, 2000s, and 2010s, with his most recent album being 2018's Out of the Blues.

Scaggs is credited for helping the formation of Toto. For his 1976 album, Silk Degrees, he hand picked musicians after taking suggestions from several people. These musicians were David Paich, David Hungate, and Jeff Porcaro. The three were already friends and had frequently performed together on other albums, such as Steely Dan's Pretzel Logic. By going on tour with Scaggs, it solidified the prospect of starting a band. Columbia picked up on this talent by offering the new group a contract "without audition". Steve Porcaro described this as "a record deal thrown in our laps". Paich stated "I'm not sure if Toto would have happened as soon, or quite the same way, without Silk Degrees". Their friendship has continued throughout the decades shown by the varying collaborations and concerts performed together. Paich teamed up once more for Scaggs' 2001 album, Dig, where he contributed to 6 out of the 11 songs.

Early life and career
Scaggs was born in Canton, Ohio, the eldest child to Royce and Helen Scaggs. His father was a traveling salesman who had flown in the Army Air Corp during World War II. Their family moved to McAlester, Oklahoma, then to Plano, Texas (at that time a farm town), just north of Dallas. He learned his first instrument, the cello, at age 9. He received a scholarship to attend a private school in Dallas, St. Mark's School of Texas.

At St. Mark's he met Steve Miller, who helped him to learn the guitar at age 12. A classmate wanted to give Scaggs a "weird" nickname. This started out as "Bosley", then "Boswell" and "Bosworth". The name was later shortened to Boz. In 1959, he became the vocalist for Miller's band, The Marksmen. After graduation in 1962, the pair later attended the University of Wisconsin–Madison together, playing in blues bands like the Ardells and the Fabulous Knight Trains.

Leaving school due to his love for music in 1963, Scaggs signed up for the army reserves and formed a new band, The Wigs. By 1965, the band joined the burgeoning R&B scene in London. However, success never materialized and the group disbanded within a few months. Scaggs then travelled throughout Europe, earning money from busking. He arrived in Stockholm, Sweden where he recorded his first solo debut album, Boz, in 1965 with the Karusell Grammofon AB label, which failed commercially. He also had a brief stint with the band the Other Side with Mac MacLeod and Jack Downing.

Returning to the U.S., Scaggs promptly headed for the booming psychedelic music center of San Francisco in 1967 after receiving a postcard invitation from Steve Miller to join his band. Scaggs travelled to the U.S. via India & Nepal. Linking up with Steve Miller again, he appeared on the Steve Miller Band's first two albums, Children of the Future and Sailor in 1968. He left the band due to different music tastes and upset between himself and Miller at the time. Scaggs secured a solo contract with Atlantic Records in 1968, releasing his second album, Boz Scaggs, featuring the Muscle Shoals Rhythm Section and session guitarist Duane Allman, in 1969. Despite good reviews, this release achieved only moderate sales. He then briefly hooked up with Bay Area band Mother Earth in a supporting role on their second album Make a Joyful Noise on guitar and backup vocals.

Scaggs next signed with Columbia Records releasing the albums Moments in 1971 and My Time in 1972. His first two Columbia albums were modest sellers and seeking a new more soulful direction his record company brought in former Motown producer Johnny Bristol for 1974's Slow Dancer album. Although the album only made No. 81 on the US Billboard Album Chart, it subsequently attained gold status, no doubt getting a boost from the huge success of Scaggs's next album Silk Degrees.

1976–1981: the hit years
In 1976, using session musicians who later formed Toto, he recorded Silk Degrees, with Joe Wissert on producing duties. The album, which received a Grammy nomination for album of the year and a further nomination for Wissert as Producer of the Year, reached No. 2 on the US Billboard 200, and No. 1 in a number of other countries, spawning four hit singles: "It's Over", "Lowdown", "What Can I Say", and "Lido Shuffle", as well as the poignant ballad "We're All Alone", which Rita Coolidge (who had performed backing vocals on an earlier Scaggs album) took to the top of the charts in 1977. "Lowdown" sold over one million copies in the US and won the Grammy Award for Best R&B Song, which was shared by Scaggs and David Paich. In Saturday Night Fever, John Travolta choreographed his dance to "Lowdown". In an interview, Travolta states "The Bee Gees weren’t even involved in the movie in the beginning, I was dancing to Stevie Wonder and Boz Scaggs." However, Columbia denied the song's use as there was another disco movie using "Lowdown" (Looking for Mr. Goodbar).

A sellout world tour followed. Scaggs was performing at Avery Fisher Hall in New York's Lincoln Center during the infamous July 13th New York City blackout in 1977. He was around 15 minutes into the concert when the power went out. Scaggs told the audience to save their ticket stubs as he would do a repeat concert on the Friday night, a few days after. Scaggs performed with Fleetwood Mac for a few concerts between 1976 and 1977.

His follow-up album in 1977 Down Two Then Left did not sell as well as Silk Degrees and neither of its singles reached the Top 40. For Down Two Then Left, Scaggs continued working with Toto and additionally Ray Parker Jr, who later created the Ghostbusters theme song in 1984.

The 1980 album Middle Man spawned two top 20 hits, "Breakdown Dead Ahead" (No. 15, Hot 100) and "Jojo" (No. 17, Hot 100); and Scaggs also enjoyed two more top 20 hits in 1980–81, "Look What You've Done to Me", from the Urban Cowboy soundtrack, and "Miss Sun", from a greatest hits set, both reaching No. 14 on the Hot 100. "Miss Sun" was an unreleased Toto demo from 1977 .

Later career

Scaggs took a long break from recording as he felt making music became a "career" and that music had "left him". He did attempt to make a new album in 1983, but "it didn't feel right". In 1985, he succumbed to feelings of anxiety and felt he had to get a record out as there was "something very big missing" in his life.

Scaggs' next album, Other Roads, did not appear until 1988 due to Columbia rejecting the record as "they didn't feel they had a strong hit single", making Scaggs spend more time perfecting the album. "Heart of Mine", from Other Roads, is Scaggs' last top-40 hit as of 2018. Also in 1988, he opened the San Francisco nightclub, Slim's, and remained an owner of the venue until the club's closure in 2020.

From 1989 to 1992, Scaggs joined Donald Fagen, Phoebe Snow, Michael McDonald and others in the New York Rock and Soul Revue.

In 1992, Scaggs performed at Toto's tribute concert for Jeff Porcaro, along with Don Henley, Donald Fagen, Eddie Van Halen, George Harrison, and Michael McDonald.

His next solo release was the album Some Change in 1994. He issued Come On Home, an album of rhythm and blues, and My Time: A Boz Scaggs Anthology, an anthology, in 1997.

In the summer of 1998 Boz went on tour as the opening act for Stevie Nicks.

After another hiatus from recording, his next album, Dig, got good reviews, although the CD was released on an unfortunate date September 11, 2001. In May 2003, Scaggs released But Beautiful, a collection of jazz standards that debuted at number one on the jazz chart. In 2008 he released Speak Low, which he described in the liner notes as "a sort of progressive, experimental effort ... along the lines of some of the ideas that Gil Evans explored." During 2004, he released a DVD and a live 16-track CD Greatest Hits Live that was recorded August 2003 at the Great American Music Hall in San Francisco.

After a break in recording, he undertook a series of shows across the US in 2008. Two years later he joined Donald Fagen and Michael McDonald for concerts entitled the Dukes of September Rhythm Revue. 

His next album Memphis was released in March 2013. It was recorded in that Southern American city at the Royal Studios. The album included some of his favorite compositions from other artists. A tour of the United States, Canada and Japan followed the release. Before the year ended, he added live dates across North America and Australia for 2014. In 2015, he released A Fool to Care, a compilation of mostly covers, including "Whispering Pines" with Lucinda Williams, and one original blues composition, "Hell to Pay," performed with Bonnie Raitt. The album rose to number 1 on the Billboard Blues Album chart and number 54 on the Billboard 200. In 2018, he released Out of the Blues, reaching number 1 on the Billboard Top Blues Albums chart.

Personal life
Scaggs married his first wife, Donna Carmella Storniola, in 1973. They had two sons: Austin, a music journalist for Rolling Stone, and Oscar, who died in 1998 from a heroin overdose. Scaggs and Carmella divorced in 1980. After 3.5 years, Scaggs won joint custody of his sons. Carmella died in February 2017.

In 1992 he married Dominique Gioia. In 1996, they moved to Napa Valley and planted 2.2 acres of Grenache, Mourvedre, Syrah, and Counoisn. In 2000 they made their first wine. In 2006, Scaggs Vineyard was certified organic. In 2016, Scaggs sold his plot to Newfound Wines.

In 2017, Scaggs' house burnt down as a result of the Northern California wildfires in October. He and his wife were on tour, so they weren’t harmed by the fires. However, he lost everything: his vineyard, cars, and sentimental objects such as decades worth of legal pads and cocktail napkins with lyrics on them.

Awards & nominations

In 2019, Scaggs was awarded the Texas Medal of Arts.

Discography

With the Steve Miller Band

Solo albums

* While the 1969 self-titled Atlantic album failed to chart upon initial release, it peaked at No. 171 when reissued in 1974. Three years later the album was reissued once again, this time in a remixed form. This version, however, only bubbled under the Billboard 200, reaching No. 209.

* Rolling Stone ranked this album at number 496 on its list of the 500 Greatest Albums of All Time.

Compilation albums

Singles

See also
Notable alumni of St. Mark's School of Texas
List of celebrities who own wineries and vineyards

References

External links
Official website

1944 births
American blues guitarists
American male singer-songwriters
American rhythm and blues guitarists
American rhythm and blues singers
American rock guitarists
American rock singers
American soft rock musicians
American soul guitarists
American male guitarists
Blues rock musicians
Grammy Award winners
Living people
Columbia Records artists
Virgin Records artists
Atlantic Records artists
Musicians from Dallas
Singer-songwriters from Texas
Musicians from Canton, Ohio
People from McAlester, Oklahoma
St. Mark's School (Texas) alumni
University of Wisconsin–Madison alumni
American expatriates in England
American expatriates in Sweden
American rock songwriters
Musicians from the San Francisco Bay Area
Singer-songwriters from California
Singer-songwriters from Ohio
Singer-songwriters from Oklahoma
Wine merchants
Guitarists from California
Guitarists from Ohio
Guitarists from Oklahoma
Guitarists from Texas
Steve Miller Band members
20th-century American guitarists
20th-century American male musicians
Mother Earth (American band) members
The Dukes of September members
The New York Rock and Soul Revue members